The Duke of Chimney Butte is a 1921 American silent western film directed by Frank Borzage and starring Fred Stone, Vola Vale and Josie Sedgwick.

Cast
 Fred Stone as Jeremeah Lambert
 Vola Vale as Vesta Philbrook
 Josie Sedgwick as Grace Kerr
 Chick Morrison as Kerr - the son
 Buck Connors as Taters
 Harry Dunkinson as Jedlick

References

Bibliography
 Munden, Kenneth White. The American Film Institute Catalog of Motion Pictures Produced in the United States, Part 1. University of California Press, 1997.

External links
 

1920s American films
1921 films
1921 Western (genre) films
1920s English-language films
American silent feature films
Silent American Western (genre) films
American black-and-white films
Films directed by Frank Borzage
Film Booking Offices of America films